= Erica, Virginia =

Unincorporated community in Virginia, US

Coordinates: 38°07′06″N 76°40′44″W

Erica is an unincorporated community in Westmoreland County, in the U. S. state of Virginia.
